Peter Thompson (born 12 March 1965) is a Barbadian cricketer. He played in two first-class and four List A matches for the Barbados cricket team in 1992/93 and 1993/94.

See also
 List of Barbadian representative cricketers

References

External links
 

1965 births
Living people
Barbadian cricketers
Barbados cricketers
People from Saint James, Barbados